George William O'Dell (16 January 1901 – 1971) was an English professional footballer who played as a wing half.

Born in Hoddesdon, Hertfordshire, O'Dell was signed by Northampton Town from St Albans City in 1927. He spent five seasons at Northampton, making 147 Football League appearances for the club. He joined newly formed Wigan Athletic in 1932, and played in the club's first ever league game. He made 76 Cheshire League appearances in two seasons at the club before returning to the Football League with Newport County in 1934.

References

External links
 

1901 births
1971 deaths
English footballers
People from Hoddesdon
St Albans City F.C. players
Northampton Town F.C. players
Wigan Athletic F.C. players
Newport County A.F.C. players
English Football League players
Association football wing halves